The House of the Seven Hawks is a 1959 British mystery film directed by Richard Thorpe and starring Robert Taylor, Nicole Maurey and Linda Christian. It was the final film by Robert Taylor under his twenty five-year contract with MGM. The film follows an American captain searching for sunken treasure who becomes entangled with criminals and is arrested by the Dutch police. It is based on the Victor Canning novel The House of the Seven Flies, published in 1952.

Plot
Story of an American skipper who becomes entangled with the Dutch police and international crooks over sunken treasure but survives and finds romance.

Cast
 Robert Taylor as John Nordley 
 Nicole Maurey as Constanta Sluiter 
 Linda Christian as Elsa 
 Donald Wolfit as Inspector Van Der Stoor 
 David Kossoff as Wilhelm Dekker 
 Eric Pohlmann as Captain Rohner 
 Philo Hauser as Charlie Ponz 
 Gerard Heinz as Inspector Sluiter 
 Paul Hardtmuth as Beukleman 
 Lily Kann as Gerta 
 Richard Shaw as Police Sgt. Straatman 
 André van Gyseghem as Hotel Clerk 
 Leslie Weston as Tulper 
 Guy Deghy as Desk Lieutenant 
 Peter Welch as Gannett
 Peter Lannagan as Peter

Critical reception
In a contemporary review, The New York Times called the film "an unpretentious but satisfying entertainment"; whereas more recently, the Radio Times called it a "bland B-movie."

Box office
According to MGM records, the film earned $415,000 in the U.S. and Canada and $650,000 elsewhere, resulting in a loss of $20,000.

See also
 List of British films of 1959

References

External links

1959 films
British mystery films
1950s English-language films
Films based on British novels
Films directed by Richard Thorpe
Films scored by Clifton Parker
Films set in the Netherlands
Seafaring films
Metro-Goldwyn-Mayer films
Films shot at MGM-British Studios
1950s British films